Jack Kramer (17 December 1939 – 11 February 2020) was a Norwegian football defender. He played for Vålerenga between 1957 and 1964 and represented Norway as a youth, under-21 and senior international.

References

1939 births
2020 deaths
Footballers from Oslo
Norwegian footballers
Vålerenga Fotball players
Norway youth international footballers
Norway under-21 international footballers
Norway international footballers
Association football defenders